The Andekaleka Dam is a gravity dam on the Vohitra river near Andekaleka in eastern Madagascar. The primary purpose of the dam is hydroelectric power generation and it diverts water from the Vohitra east into a  headrace tunnel where it reaches a  underground power station. After water charges the turbine-generators, it travels down a  tailrace tunnel before it reenters the Vohitra River. The dam and power station were funded by the World Bank at a cost of US$142.1 million. It was constructed between 1978 and 1982. The power station can house up to four generators. The first two were operational in 1982 and a third in 2012. Generator one and two host Vevey and Jeumont turbines while the third is made by HEC. They all use Francis reaction turbines  which typically range from 10 to 700MW  and with water head operating from 10 to 600 meters

Fire
On 02 January 2022 a fire broke out in its power plant. This caused many black-outs in Antananarivo and its surroundings. The power units will be again functional around mid-June 2022.

References

Dams completed in 1982
Dams in Madagascar
Analamanga
Gravity dams
Underground power stations
1982 establishments in Madagascar
20th-century architecture in Madagascar